Michael Elo is a Danish musician. He composed the Danish Eurovision Song Contest 1991 entry, "Lige der hvor hjertet slår", which was performed by Anders Frandsen.

Before that, Michael Elo had appeared several times in Eurovision as a backing singer for the Danish entries.

Since his 1991 entry, Michael Elo was seen as one of the judges on the Danish "look-alike" talent competition "Stjerneskud" in 1995, and he has also voiced several cartoons in the Danish language, as well as written translated lyrics for Disney songs and more.

References 

Living people
20th-century Danish musicians
21st-century Danish musicians
Danish composers